The ARV Super2 (Air Recreational Vehicle) is a British two-seat light aircraft with strut-braced shoulder wings and tricycle landing gear.  Designed by Bruce Giddings, the Super2 was available either factory-built or as a kit. It was intended to be both a cost-effective trainer and an affordable aircraft for private owners. Later called the "Opus", it gained US FAA Light-Sport Aircraft approval in February 2008.

About 35 aircraft were produced in the 1980s before the Isle of Wight-based company went into liquidation.  Subsequently, there have been a number of attempts to  restart production, all unsuccessful, of which the most recent was by Opus Aircraft. In November 2013,  Opus Aircraft announced that its assets had been auctioned off successfully, adding: "We hope to see our plans continued and to see the all-aluminum plane flying by 2015." Since 2015, little has been heard of the ARV and no resumption of production has occurred.

Design and development
Richard Noble, the world 1983 land speed record holder and UK entrepreneur, identified a gap in the market for a low-cost lightweight two-seat trainer, after expensive product-liability lawsuits in the USA had driven the major American general aviation manufacturers temporarily to abandon production of such aircraft. Noble established a factory at Sandown on the Isle of Wight to build the ARV Super2 aircraft, with the first prototype flying on 11 March 1985. The factory used some novel manufacturing techniques, including British ALCAN's "Supral" (a superplastic aluminium alloy), adhesives (to reduce the number of rivets and thereby save weight), and a bespoke new British engine, the Hewland AE75. These innovations gave the ARV an empty weight 40% lower than the Cessna 152, making the Super2 both cheaper to buy and to operate. The manufacturer claimed it could reduce pilot training costs by 25%

The ARV Super2 is a side-by-side configuration two-seater with a shoulder wing for improved visibility.  The wing is swept forward 5° to maintain correct centre of gravity balance. The wing area is a small , giving a wing loading of 11.9 lb/ft2 (58.1 kg/m2).  The forward sweep may also promote a spanwise airflow inwards towards the root, thereby reducing the likelihood of a wingtip stall.  The ARV's tapered fibreglass wingtips help to reduce drag from wingtip vortices.

The ARV is constructed mainly of aluminium alloy, with fibreglass wingtips, cowlings and canopy frame. The cockpit is a stiff monocoque of "Supral" alloy for lightness and improved crash protection. Aft of the cockpit bulkhead, the ARV is conventionally built, with frames, longerons and a stressed skin forming a semi-monocoque.  Skin sections are both glued and riveted. The aircraft has twin control sticks.  Ailerons, elevators and flaps are pushrod-controlled, but the rudder and trim are cable-linked.  The rudder pedals also control a steerable nosewheel, but the hand-operated disc brakes are not differential and do not contribute to steering.

The AE75 engine, a  inverted three-cylinder water-cooled two-stroke unit with dual ignition and a 2.7:1 reduction gearbox, was specially developed for the ARV by Hewland from their existing two-cylinder microlight engine. The AE75 engine has a TBO of only 800 hours, and, in the absence of continuing factory support, many ARVs have had their AE75s replaced with engines such as the Rotax 912, the Rotax 914, or the Jabiru 2200. Three ARVs were originally manufactured with the MidWest twin-rotor wankel engine.

The Super2 gained airworthiness certification in July 1986, and soon after entered production.  In November 1985, Noble had reached an agreement to supply ARV parts to Canada's Instar Aviation, where the aircraft was intended to be assembled for the North American market. Transport Canada had agreed to certify the aircraft based on it "meeting UK criteria", but in the end these Canadian production plans came to nothing.

Originally, ARVs were available either as kit-built aircraft (subject to PFA Permit), or factory built (and subject to the CAA Certificate of Airworthiness). In the spring of 1990 Aviation Scotland Limited was to restart production and in 1993 that company intended to set up another facility in Sweden to build ARVs. In the late 1990s the aircraft was sold in kit form in the US as the Highlander by Highlander Aircraft Corporation of Golden Valley, Minnesota.

In 2004, the CAA reclassified all ARVs as PFA (now LAA) Permit aircraft. The ARV Super2 was originally intended to be aerobatic, but the Isle of Wight factory closed before CAA clearance was obtained, so aerobatics remain prohibited. Also, the factory had planned to develop a four-seater version, wing-tip tanks and floats.

Production history
The ARV Super2 has had an interrupted production history, with a number of successive companies producing 40 aircraft in total.

Shortly after initial aircraft deliveries began, there were a number of forced landings.  These were due to gearbox failures induced by propeller vibration, and in November 1987 the CAA grounded the aircraft.  Although these problems were quickly resolved, the aircraft's reputation suffered. Buyers and investors lost confidence, leading to the closure of the Isle of Wight factory and the company was forced into administration. This resulted in a management buyout and the company being renamed Island Aircraft. Some 30 or so aircraft were completed by ARV and then by Island Aircraft at Sandown.  Production was then transferred first to Scotland and then to Sweden, where the ARV was renamed the "Opus 280", However, no aircraft were produced in Sweden before the proprietors went bankrupt in 1995. After yet another unsuccessful attempt to restart production in Ohio, USA, all manufacturing rights (plus a selection of aircraft parts) were sold to a new consortium, "Opus Aircraft". Opus Aircraft established a factory at  Rockingham, near Stoneville, North Carolina, and in  February 2008, the "Opus Super 2" was granted FAA Light Sport Aircraft approval. The factory produced an "Opus Super 2" prototype, but the proposed resumption of production never occurred. The company, valued at US$8 million, was offered for sale for US$2.9 million, and in October 2013 the company was purchased at auction.

Operational history
The ARV Super2 has received favourable reviews which describe it as an aircraft with excellent visibility that is pleasant to fly. The small wing area and the fairly high wing loading produces handling that is responsive but stable. A drawback for touring is the shortage of luggage space. The second prototype, G-STWO, has a fuselage luggage compartment aft of the fuel tank which is accessed from the starboard aside, but no other ARVs have this feature.
After initial production commenced at least two flying schools adopted the ARV, but today most Super2s in the UK are flown  privately.

The Hewland AE75 engine, which is no longer available, has a life of 800 hours, after which time alternative engines are installed. Replacement engines have all been heavier than the  original, needing a lead counterweight in the tail to maintain balance. The empenage is short-coupled and its area is a little marginal for the landing flare, so flaring with a stopped engine might prove marginal.

LAA-approved modifications include ground-adjustable propellers, tundra tyres, additional fuel tanks and fuel-injection. The LAA has approved the fitting and testing of vortex generators, with a view to reducing stall speed and improving landing flare.

Specifications (ARV Super 2)

See also

References

Notes

Bibliography

"Engine troubles grounds ARV Super 2", Flight International, 14 November 1987. p. 16.
"Sweden helps ARV Super 2 to live again". Flight International, 11–17 August 1993. p. 24.
 Blech, Robin. "Super 2 Comes of Age". Flight International, 13 September 1985. pp. 48–52.
 Blech, Robin. "Super 2 – back from the brink". Flight International, 20 May 1989. pp. 92–94.
 Daly, Kieran. "Light Work". Flight International, 21–27 September 1994. p. 30.
 Green, William: Observers Aircraft. Frederick Warne Publishing, 1987. .
 "Opus Off Key". Flight International, 27 September–3 October 1995, Volume 148, No. 4491, p. 6. . 
 "New UK trainer aims to break US mould". Flight International, 6 April 1985, Vol. 127, No. 3954. pp. 13–14.
 Taylor, John W.R., ed. Jane's All the World's Aircraft 1988–89. Coulsden, Surrey, UK: Jane's Information Group, 1988. .

External links

Opus Aircraft archives on Archive.org

1980s British civil utility aircraft
Light-sport aircraft
Shoulder-wing aircraft
Forward-swept-wing aircraft
Homebuilt aircraft
Aircraft first flown in 1985
Single-engined tractor aircraft